You Lie Like a Dog is a family game show which aired on Animal Planet in 2000.  It is a variation of To Tell The Truth with an animal theme.

Premise
Round one introduces three people who all claim to own the same pet. It's up to the panel to determine who's "lying like a dog" by quizzing them about their day-to-day life with their pet. Locating the true owner will earn the panelist 10 points.

In Round two, two "pet professionals" try to convince the panel that they are the true experts. The celebrity panelists know that only one is real and can ask questions, request demonstrations and look anything else that will help them ferret out the fake. Similar to round one, A correct guess in this round earns the panelist 25 points.

In the final round, each celebrity panelist is teamed up with one of the liars. If a panelist can get a liar to say an animal-related phrase in thirty seconds, then the panelist receives 50 points while the liar received $200.

External links
 Original Comedy Game Show Set to Premiere on Monday, January 31 on Animal Planet
 

Animal Planet original programming
2000s American reality television series
2000s American comedy game shows
2000 American television series debuts
2000 American television series endings
Metaphors referring to dogs